The Mountain Rim Gymnastics Conference (MRGC) is a National Collegiate Athletic Association (NCAA) Division I women's gymnastics conference for schools that do not have women's gymnastics as a sponsored sport in their primary conferences.  Established in 2013 and sponsoring its first competitions in 2014, the conference was recognized by the NCAA in the summer of 2014  and held its first "official" championships in March 2015 with qualifying athletes advancing to the Regionals of the NCAA Women's Gymnastics Championships.

Members 
Departing members are highlighted in red.

Former member

Champions

 *Cancelled due to the coronavirus pandemic

See also
NCAA Women's Gymnastics Championships

References

External links
Official website

NCAA conferences
College gymnastics by conference in the United States
NCAA Division I conferences
College women's gymnastics in the United States
Women's sports organizations in the United States
2013 establishments in the United States